Chok Chai is a village and tambon (sub-district) of Doi Luang District, in Chiang Rai Province, Thailand. In 2005 it had a population of 8,793 people. The tambon contains 11 villages.

References

Tambon of Chiang Rai province
Populated places in Chiang Rai province